Sandhithathum Sindhithathum is a 2013 Indian Tamil-language romantic drama film directed by Balu Anand and starring Sathya, Yudasha, Kumarajan, and Shobaraj. The film is based on a true incident that happened in Bangalore and Nammakal. The film resurfaced in the news in 2021 after Kumarajan's death.

Cast 

Sathya as Selvam
Yudasha as Gopika
Kumarajan as Kumaresan
Ganja Karuppu
Nizhagal Ravi
Shobaraj as Kempe Gowda
L. Raja as Devaraj
Sabitha Anand as Kumaresan's mother
Riythvika as Kumaresan's sister
Sharmili
Mithra Kurian as Aravind's coworker
Balu Anand
Kadhal Saravanan
King Kong
Kottachi

Production 
Balu Anand returns to direction after a long hiatus.

Reception 
The Times of India wrote that "It has elements for a decent thriller but we are forced to sit through mundane scenes and insufferable acting, not to mention out-of-the-blue songs". Maalaimalar gave a negative review.

References 

Indian romantic drama films
2010s Tamil-language films